Something Real is the thirteenth studio album by American recording R&B artist Stephanie Mills. It was released by MCA Records on November 24, 1992. Her final recording with the music label, the album peaked at number 22 on the US Top R&B Albums chart. Its lead single "All Day, All Night" reached the top 20 on the Hot R&B Singles chart also  her second single"Never do You Wrong" reach the top 20 on the hot R&B singles chart at #18. The song "All In How Much We Give" was written for the animated musical adventure comedy film Tom and Jerry: The Movie (1992).

Track listing

Personnel
Adapted from album booklet.
Co-producer – Stephanie Mills (tracks: 5, 10), Steve Legassick (tracks: 3)
Executive-Producer – Stephanie Mills
Mastered By – Steve Hall
Drums – Bronek (tracks: 7), Rodney Barber (tracks: 10)
Guitar – Brian Ray (tracks: 3), Eric Brice (tracks: 5), Dean Parks (tracks: 7), [Rhythm Guitar] - Marlon McClain (tracks: 8)
Backing Vocals – Alexandra Brown, Lorraine Perry, Tonya Kelly (tracks: 1-2), Donald Lawrence, Reginald Adams, Richard Odom, Rodney Barber, Terry Phillips (tracks: 3-5), Donald Lawrence, Reginald Adams, Richard Odom, Rodney Barber, Stephanie Mills, Terry Phillips, Terry Wood, Tonya Harris (tracks: 6-8), Donald Lawrence, Reginald Adams, Richard Odom, Terry Phillips (tracks: 10, 11), Terri Robinson (tracks:12)
Saxophone – Gerald Albright (tracks: 2), Dave Koz (tracks: 6, 11)
Bass – James McKay (tracks: 10)
Keyboards – Jeff Lorber (tracks: 6, 8, 9, 11), Kevin Bond (tracks: 5, 10)
Mixed By – Donald Lawrence (tracks: 5, 10), Elliott Peters (tracks: 12), Rodney Barber (tracks: 5, 10), Tony Peluso (tracks: 3, 4, 5, 6, 7, 8, 9, 10, 11), Victor Flores (tracks: 1, 2)
Producer – Dave "Jam" Hall (tracks: 12), Donald Lawrence (tracks: 5, 10), Kenny Harris (tracks: 7), Stephanie Mills (tracks: 8, 11), Steve Barri (tracks: 3, 4, 6-9, 11), Tony Peluso (tracks: 3, 4, 6-9, 11), Vassal Benford (tracks: 1, 2)
Recorded By – David Kennedy (tracks: 12), Mark Williams (2) (tracks: 5, 10), Tony Peluso (tracks: 3, 4, 5, 6, 7, 8, 9, 10, 11), Tracy Schnieder (tracks: 5, 10), Victor Flores (tracks: 1, 2)
Recorded By [Additional] – Bobby Brooks (tracks: 3), Jeff Lorber (tracks: 6, 8, 9, 11)

Charts

References

1992 albums
Stephanie Mills albums
MCA Records albums